The 1996–97 Drexel Dragons men's basketball team represented Drexel University  during the 1996–97 NCAA Division I men's basketball season. The Dragons, led by 6th year head coach Bill Herrion, played their home games at the Daskalakis Athletic Center and were members of the America East Conference (AEC).

The team finished the season 22–9, and finished in 2nd place in the AEC in the regular season.

Roster

Schedule

|-
!colspan=9 style="background:#F8B800; color:#002663;"| Regular season
|-

|-
!colspan=9 style="background:#F5CF47; color:#002663;"| AEC tournament

|-
!colspan=9 style="background:#F5CF47; color:#002663;"| NIT

Awards
Mike DeRocckis
AEC All-Conference Second Team

Chuck Guittar
AEC All-Conference Third Team
AEC Player of the Week

Joe Linderman
AEC Rookie of the Year
AEC All-Conference Third Team
AEC All-Rookie Team
AEC All-Championship Team
AEC  Rookie of the Week (2)

Jeff Myers
AEC All-Conference First Team
AEC All-Championship Team
AEC Player of the Week (2)

References

Drexel Dragons men's basketball seasons
Drexel
1996 in sports in Pennsylvania
1997 in sports in Pennsylvania